Weekend Festival Baltic was the Estonian edition of the Weekend Festival, the largest dance music festival in Scandinavia. Stages are headlined by DJs from across the electronic dance music spectrum, with audiovisual support. The Estonian version of the event first took place in 2015.

History
Weekend Festival started off in Finland in 2012 and has since grown into one of Europe's largest festivals with focus on the electronic dance music scene. In 2015, Weekend Festival expanded to the Baltic region, taking place at Pärnu beach in Estonia, whilst simultaneously running in the original location of Helsinki. In 2016, Weekend Festival is expanding to a third location, in Stockholm, Sweden.

Artist line-ups

2015

2016

2017

2018

See also
List of electronic music festivals

References

External links

 Weekend Festival Baltic on Facebook

Music festivals established in 2015
Electronic music festivals in Estonia
Summer events in Estonia